Michael Patrick Glavine (born January 24, 1973) is a baseball coach and former first baseman who played in Major League Baseball (MLB) for the New York Mets in 2003. He is the current head baseball coach of the Northeastern Huskies, and is the brother of Baseball Hall of Famer Tom Glavine.

Playing career

Amateur
Glavine is a graduate of Northeastern University where he played college baseball for the Huskies under coach Neil McPhee from 1992 to 1995. He was named to the All-Tournament Team at the 1994 NAC Tournament. After the 1994 season, he played collegiate summer baseball with the Hyannis Mets of the Cape Cod Baseball League and was named a league all-star. Glavine became the fourth Husky to play in Major League Baseball, and was elected to the Northeastern Athletics Hall of Fame in 2006.

Professional
He was selected by the Cleveland Indians in the 22nd round of the 1995 MLB Draft. Glavine was called up to the Mets on September 12, 2003, joining his brother on the team. He played in six games and had one hit in seven at bats for the 2003 Mets. He and his brother Tom were the first set of brothers to play for the Mets.

Coaching career
Glavine returned to Northeastern as an assistant coach in 2007, and succeeded Neil McPhee as head coach after the 2014 season.

Head coaching record

References

External links

1973 births
Living people
New York Mets players
Northeastern Huskies baseball coaches
Northeastern Huskies baseball players
Hyannis Harbor Hawks players
Somerset Patriots players
People from Concord, Massachusetts
Sportspeople from Middlesex County, Massachusetts
Baseball players from Massachusetts
Baseball coaches from Massachusetts
Major League Baseball first basemen
Burlington Indians players (1986–2006)
Columbus Red Stixx players
Greenville Braves players
Kinston Indians players
Norfolk Tides players
Richmond Braves players